Stanisław Narutowicz (2 September 1862, Telšiai, Kovno Governorate – 31 December 1932, Kaunas, Lithuania) was a lawyer and politician, one of the twenty signatories of the Act of Independence of Lithuania and brother to the first president of Poland Gabriel Narutowicz. He was also the only Polish–Lithuanian member of the Taryba, the provisional Lithuanian parliament formed in the later stages of World War I.

Biography
The Narutowicz family, which had its roots in Lithuanian nobility, received a coat of arms in 1413, changing its name from Noručiai (singular Norutis) to Narutowicz in the process. He was a self-declared Samogitian, Lithuanian and a Pole. His parents, Jan Narutowicz and Wiktoria née Szczepkowska were landowners and ran a manor. His father took part in the January Uprising of 1863, which was a revolt that took place in the former Polish–Lithuanian Commonwealth against Tsarist oppression.

While studying at the Liepāja Gymnasium and later at the St. Petersburg University, he collected Lithuanian folklore and distributed Lithuanian language books whenever he returned home on his vacations.

He graduated from the faculty of law at Kiev University. During his studies in Kiev, Narutowicz joined the Polish circle of students and became a member of the II Proletaryat, an underground socialist-revolutionary party and the predecessor of the Polish Socialist Party. However, his beliefs were much less radical than those of his colleagues, and with time his contacts with the far left weakened.

Early in his life Narutowicz married Joanna née Billewicz, owner of the Brėvikai manor and a cousin of Józef Piłsudski. After 1907, the couple created and maintained a secondary school for girls in Telšiai. It was the first such school for girls in Russian Empire where teaching in Lithuanian and Polish was permitted. In the period preceding World War I Narutowicz published articles in various Polish language newspapers. He also was the publisher of the first issues of the Tygodnik Powszechny weekly. The couple were also involved in several educational programs whose goal was increasing learning skills among the Lithuanian peasants, and their children who inhabited the area.

Politician
As a politician, Narutowicz was a mild socialist or a social-democrat. He was a supporter of independence of Lithuania rather than of restoring a Polish–Lithuanian Commonwealth, mostly from fear that the far more populous Poland would gain the upper hand in such a union. On the other hand, he supported a loose union between the states, which made him one of the leaders of the krajowcy movement, a group of Polish Lithuanians loyal to the legacy of the Grand Duchy of Lithuania and supporting reconciliation of divided loyalties of local Poles between Poland and Lithuania. In his vision, the Polish minority in Lithuania would gain a status similar to the Walloons in Belgium: with separate culture and language, but united with Lithuanians by what he called "state patriotism". At the same time he also supported close ties between the nations formerly constituting the Grand Duchy of Lithuania and took part in various Polish-Lithuanian-Belarusian enterprises.

At the 1905 Great Seimas of Vilnius, he suggested that all estates be disbanded  and the land distributed amongst poorer peasants. It was a quite unexpected proposal for most of the deputies.

During the 1917 Vilnius Conference he stated his primary goal as "An independent Lithuania within ethnic Lithuanian lands". In September 1917 Narutowicz joined the Council of Lithuania (Lietuvos Taryba), a Lithuanian governing body established by the Germans as part of their Mitteleuropa plan, yet largely independent and striving for establishment of Lithuania as an independent state. As a member of that body, Narutowicz became one of twenty signatories of the Act of Independence of Lithuania. However, following the conflicts within the Taryba he took a more anti-German stance than most of his colleagues. After the body asked the government of Germany for protection and help and vowed for a stable and strong alliance with the German Reich, Narutowicz protested. When, on 26 January 1918, 12 of the Taryba's members voted for compromise with Germany, Narutowicz and three of his social-democratic colleagues (Steponas Kairys, Jonas Vileišis and Mykolas Biržiška) resigned their posts. Lithuania and Poland came into increasing intense conflicts in the years that followed. Narutowicz continued to actively support a rapprochement but met with little success.

Death and legacy
Narutowicz committed suicide on 31 December 1932 in Kaunas. Polish historian Krzysztof Buchowski of the University of Białystok attributes his suicide to alienation resulting from the futility of his endeavors, denounced on both sides of the border, as well as to the increasingly hostile stance of the Lithuanian government towards the Polish minority in Lithuania. His biography published by the National Museum of Lithuania attributes his suicide to depression, family issues, and economic hardship.

Narutowicz's son Kazimierz Narutowicz (1904–1987) was also an activist in the interwar period, engaged in the issue of Polish-Lithuanian relations. Narutowicz's widow continued to run various schools in Lithuania, notably the Polish gymnasium in Kaunas. After the outbreak of World War II she retired to her manor in Brėvikiai, but left Lithuania for Warsaw, where she died in 1948.

References

External links
 Bio in Lithuanian 

1862 births
1932 suicides
People from Telšiai District Municipality
People from Telshevsky Uyezd
Members of the Council of Lithuania
Lithuanian independence activists
20th-century Lithuanian lawyers
Lithuanian book smugglers
Suicides by firearm in Lithuania